Brissopsis oldhami is a species of sea urchins of the family Brissidae. Their armour is covered with spines. Brissopsis oldhami was first scientifically described in 1893 by Alcock.

References

External links 
 

Animals described in 1893
oldhami